Ella J. Bradley-Hughley (1889–1918) was an American choir director, and a soprano soloist (or operatic prima donna). She was well known and active in Los Angeles between 1911 until 1918, where she was given the nickname the "Queen of Song".

Biography 
She was born as Ella J. Bradley on March 1, 1889 in Dallas, Texas, to a Black Christian family. She attended Bishop College in Marshall, Texas and graduated in 1907. In 1911, she married David H. Hughley in Dallas, and together they moved to Los Angeles, California shortly after marriage. In Los Angeles she studied with Armenian gospel singer, J. Jurakian; George H. Carr; and with Spanish operatic singer, Florencio Constantino.

Her first performance in Los Angeles was presented by Reverend J. T. Hill at the Wesley Chapel. She served as the department head of voice-culture department at the Wilkins Conservatory of Music (also known as the Wilkins Piano Academy), founded by William Wilkins.

She died in February 1918.

References 

1889 births
1918 deaths
American operatic sopranos
Singers from Los Angeles
20th-century African-American women singers
People from Dallas
19th-century American women musicians
Singers from Texas
Classical musicians from Texas